The 2005 Oschersleben DTM round was a motor racing event for the Deutsche Tourenwagen Masters held between 24–26 June 2005. The event, part of the 19th season of the DTM, was held at the Motorsport Arena Oschersleben in Germany.

Results

Qualifying 
Super pole was cancelled due to heavy rain. Grid order was set by qualifying results.

Race

Championship standings after the race 

 Note: Only the top five positions are included for three sets of standings.

References

External links 
Official website

|- style="text-align:center"
| width="35%"| Previous race:
| width="30%"| Deutsche Tourenwagen Masters2005 season
| width="40%"| Next race:

Oschersleben DTM
Deutsche Tourenwagen Masters